The Live Lounge Tour was a tour taken by BBC Radio 1 from 2006 to 2011 This features Jo Whiley later Fearne Cotton going to the Live Lounge artists' house, houseboat, local pub, mum's house, etc. to have a look around at a place that means something to the artist. In 2010 the Live Lounge Tour was rebranded the "Radio 1's Student Tour" with Fearne Cotton and Zane Lowe.

2006

2007

2008

2009

2010 Student Tour

2011 Student Tour

References

Live Lounge